Canarium  is a genus of sea snails, marine gastropod mollusks in the family Strombidae, the true conchs.

Species
Species within the genus Canarium include:
Canarium betuleti (Kronenberg, 1991)
Canarium erythrinum (Dillwyn, 1817)
Canarium fusiforme (Sowerby, 1842)
Canarium hellii (Kiener, 1843)
Canarium klineorum (Abbott, 1960)
Canarium labiatum (Röding, 1798)
Canarium maculatum (Sowerby, 1842)
Canarium microurceus Kira, 1959
Canarium mutabile (Swainson, 1821)
Canarium ochroglottis (Abbott, 1960)
Canarium olydium (Duclos, 1844)
Canarium rugosum (Sowerby, 1825)
Canarium scalariforme (Duclos, 1833)
Canarium urceus (Linnaeus, 1758)
Canarium wilsonorum (Abbott, 1967)
Species brought into synonymy 
Canarium haemastoma (Sowerby, 1842): synonym of Canarium scalariforme (Duclos, 1833)
 Canarium otiolum Iredale, 1931: synonym of Canarium labiatum (Röding, 1798)
Canarium ustulatum Schumacher, 1817: synonym of Canarium urceus urceus (Linnaeus, 1758)

References

 Bandel K. (2007) About the larval shell of some Stromboidea, connected to a review of the classification and phylogeny of the Strombimorpha (Caenogastropoda). Freiberger Forschungshefte, ser. C 524: 97-206. page(s): 151
 Liverani V. (2014) The superfamily Stromboidea. Addenda and corrigenda. In: G.T. Poppe, K. Groh & C. Renker (eds), A conchological iconography. pp. 1-54, pls 131-164. Harxheim: Conchbooks.

External links
 Schumacher C.F. (1817). Essai d'un nouveau système des habitations des vers testacés. Schultz, Copenghagen. iv + 288 pp., 22 pls

Strombidae